Hendersonville is an unincorporated community in Colleton County, South Carolina, United States. It is located along U.S. Alternate Route 17 south of Walterboro.

John Thomas Kennedy (1885-1969), United States Army Brigadier General and recipient of the Medal of Honor was born in Hendersonville.

Notes

Unincorporated communities in Colleton County, South Carolina
Unincorporated communities in South Carolina